Suriyan Chandiran is a 1993 Indian Tamil-language masala film written and directed by K. S. Ravikumar from a story by S. Ramanath. The film stars Anand Babu, Keerthana and Saravanan. It was released on 25 February 1993.

Plot

Cast

Soundtrack 
The music composed by Deva and lyrics written by Kalidasan.

Reception 
Ayyappa Prasad of The Indian Express wrote, "Sooriyan Chandran has an interesting storyline marked by good performances by Anand Babu and Saravanan in the main roles". Kalki called it a routine masala fare, but the way it was presented was brand new.

References

External links 
 

1990s masala films
1990s Tamil-language films
1993 films
Films directed by K. S. Ravikumar
Films scored by Deva (composer)